Miguel Falcón García-Ramos (born 24 April 1979) is a Spanish retired footballer who played as a central midfielder, and a current manager.

He amassed Segunda División totals of 185 games and six goals over eight seasons, in representation of five clubs.

Playing career
Falcón was born in Toledo, Castile-La Mancha. After rough starts in Madrid, only appearing for Atlético's B and C-teams, he joined another club in the city, CD Leganés, but appeared very rarely during a sole second division season. Subsequently, staying in that level, he stabilised his career, going on to spend five campaigns with Ciudad de Murcia – they were renamed Granada 74 CF for 2007–08.

Following Granada's 2008 relegation, Falcón signed with FC Cartagena of division three, helping them promote in his first year. He contributed with 29 league games the following campaign, as the Murcia side overachieved for a final fifth place.

In July 2010, aged 31, Falcón returned to the third tier after moving to Real Oviedo. Two years later, he signed for his hometown club CD Toledo in the Tercera División.

Coaching career
Falcón retired at the end of the 2012–13 season – in which Toledo won promotion – and became assistant manager. When Onésimo Sánchez was dismissed in January 2018, he was named head coach. In June, after being unable to prevent relegation, he was given a job in the club's academy.

Managerial statistics

References

External links

1979 births
Living people
Sportspeople from Toledo, Spain
Spanish footballers
Footballers from Castilla–La Mancha
Association football midfielders
Segunda División players
Segunda División B players
Tercera División players
Atlético Madrid C players
Atlético Madrid B players
Mérida UD footballers
CD Leganés players
Ciudad de Murcia footballers
Granada 74 CF footballers
FC Cartagena footballers
Real Oviedo players
CD Toledo players
Spanish football managers
Segunda División B managers
CD Toledo managers